Bel Air High School is a high school in Bel Air, Harford County, Maryland, United States. The current building opened in 2009, though the school's antecedents date back to 1715.

History

Bel Air High School began as the Harford County Academy when it was formed by an act of the Maryland General Assembly in 1811.  The first school building was a stuccoed stone building built at 24 E. Pennsylvania Avenue, and the name was soon changed to the Bel Air Academy in 1815.  John Wilkes Booth attended the school in the 1850s.

In 1867, while the Bel Air Academy was operating separately, a wooden one-room school house was built on Main Street, which functioned as the main public school of the county.

In 1882, a brick public school was built at 45 East Gordon Street.  The school was renamed the Bel Air Academy and Graded School as the old academy merged with the public school system.  This building housed classes for all students above the third grade. Additions to the building were made in 1897 and 1910.  This building became solely a grade school in 1924 and headquartered the Harford County Board of Education after 1951.

Bel Air High School, named thus for the first time, was first formed in 1907, and classes were held at the Gordon Street building and the Pennsylvania Avenue building.

The past facility at 100 Heighe Street was opened in 1950, with additional renovations made in 1954, 1968 and 1983. The building had a design capacity of 1,423 students; as a result, 11 "portables" were in use to provide additional classroom space. A new building was scheduled for completion for the graduating class of 2010.

The current Bel Air High School building was built in 2009, and has a capacity of 1,668 students. Some new features of the school are its auditorium/stage, cafeteria, library, and multiple sports facilities.

Students
The student body over time:

YearStudents
2018–1,544
2017–1,564
2012–1,647
2011–1,574
2010–1,431
2009–1,380
2008–1,403
2007–1,683
2005–1,636
2004–1,647	
2003–1,573	
2002–1,573	
2001–1,587	
2000–1,555	
1999–1,524	
1998–1,440	
1997–1,383	
1996–1,312	
1995–1,295	
1994–1,272	
1993–1,238

Notable alumni 
 Andrew Berry, General Manager of the Cleveland Browns
 John Wilkes Booth, Actor, assassinated President Abraham Lincoln
 James H. Broumel (died 1948), Maryland delegate
 Richard Cassilly, Metropolitan Opera NYC
 William A. Clark, former Maryland Delegate (1983–1990)
 Joseph H. Deckman, elected to National Lacrosse Hall of Fame in 1965.
 Donald C. Fry, former Maryland Senator and Delegate.
 William C. Greer (died 2001), Maryland delegate
 James M. Harkins, former Maryland Delegate (1990-1998), Harford County Executive (1998-2005), & leader of Maryland Environmental Services (2005–present).
 W. Dale Hess (1930–2016), Maryland delegate
 J. Robert Hooper,  Maryland State Senator (1936 - 2008)
 Julienne Irwin Finalist on the NBC show America's Got Talent
 Walter R. McComas (1879–1922), Maryland delegate and state's attorney
 Winton B. Osborne (died 1998), Maryland delegate and businessman
 Donna Stifler, Delegate for District 35A

Controversy

Scrabble Day
According to Fox News, in early October 2017 a group of Bel Air High School students posed and spelt out a racial slur across their chests. The incident led to serious criticism of the school's policies and environment for education. Since the scandal broke a Change.org petition was formed calling for "Zero Tolerance for Racism in the School." The petition currently has over 20,000 signatures.

References

External links 

Bel Air High School – official website
School State performance report

Bel Air, Harford County, Maryland
Harford County Public Schools
Public high schools in Maryland
Educational institutions established in 1811